Mohamed Mjid (1916–20 March 2014) was a Moroccan politician and president of the Royal Moroccan Tennis Federation.

Life
In his youth Mohamed Mjid was a militant in the national movement for the independence of Morocco, activities for which he was arrested and imprisoned. After the independence he became active in politics and NGOs. In 1964 he was appointed as the president of the Tennis Federation, a position he held until 2009. He was also elected as an MP for Safi, as part of the National Rally of Independents. 
 
On 20 March 2014, Mjid died in a hospital in Rabat and was buried in Casablanca. His funerals were attended by high-profile personalities such as Fouad Ali El Himma and Prince Rachid, the brother of Mohammed VI.

References

1916 births
2014 deaths
People from Safi, Morocco
Moroccan activists
National Rally of Independents politicians
Members of the House of Representatives (Morocco)
Recipients of orders, decorations, and medals of Senegal